Kankou Coulibaly (born April 11, 1990) is a Malian basketball player for Universitario Dakar and the Malian national team.

She participated at the 2017 Women's Afrobasket.

References

1990 births
Living people
Malian women's basketball players
Sportspeople from Bamako
Forwards (basketball)
Malian expatriate sportspeople in Senegal
Malian expatriate basketball people in Tunisia
21st-century Malian people